David Hurn (born 21 July 1934) is a British documentary photographer and member of Magnum Photos.

Life and work
Hurn was born on 21 July 1934 in Redhill, Surrey, England. He was raised in Cardiff, Wales. Because of his dyslexia he joined the school camera club. After leaving school he headed for London, hoping to become a photographer.

Hurn is a self-taught photographer. He began his career in 1955 when he worked for Reflex Agency. He gained his reputation as a photojournalist for his documentation of the Hungarian revolution of 1956, and is featured in two of Ken Russell's films for the Monitor television arts' series, A House in Bayswater (1960), and Watch the Birdie (1963). In 1965 he became associated with Magnum Photos and became a full member in 1967.

In 1963, Hurn was commissioned by the producers of the James Bond films to shoot a series of stills with Sean Connery and the actresses of From Russia with Love.  When the theatrical property Walther PPK pistol didn't arrive, Hurn volunteered the use of his own Walther LP-53 air pistol. The pistol became a symbol of James Bond on many film posters of the series.

In 1967 Dino de Laurentiis asked Hurn to travel to Rome to shoot photos of Jane Fonda in Barbarella.

Hurn returned to Wales in the late 1960s, initially living in a van for a year photographing the country. He was married from 1964–71 to American actress Alita Naughton (1942-2019), best known for her role in Ken Russell’s French Dressing (1964).

In 1973 he set up the School of Documentary Photography in Newport, Wales. Eventually, he turned away from documentary photojournalism, bringing a more personal approach to his image making. He says, "There are many forms of photography. I consider myself simply a recorder of that which I find of interest around me. I personally have no desire to create or stage direct ideas." His book, Wales: Land of My Father (2000), illustrates the traditional and the modern aspects of Wales.

In 2001 he was diagnosed with colon cancer but made a full recovery. He continues to live and work in Wales, and has donated a collection of photographs taken by him and other leading contemporary photographers, including Henri Cartier-Bresson, Eve Arnold, and Bill Brandt, to the National Museum of Wales.

Hurn has been an avid collector of photography. Remarkably, he has amassed his private collection by swapping works with other photographers. The collection National Museum Cardiff comprises approximately 700 photographs. Swaps: Photographs from the David Hurn Collection, National Museum Cardiff, Wales, September 2017 – April 2018.

In 2017 Hurn donated 1500 of his photographs, and 700 of other peoples' photographs, to Amgueddfa Cymru – National Museum Wales. He built his private collection of other peoples' work by swapping prints with them. National Museum Cardiff held an exhibition of the latter collection in 2017/2018, entitled Swaps: Photographs from the David Hurn Collection.

Publications

Publications by Hurn
 David Hurn: Photographs 1956-1976. London: Arts Council of Great Britain, 1979. .
 Wales: Land of My Father. London: Thames & Hudson, 2000. .
 Living in Wales. Bridgend: Seren, 2003. .
 Rebirth of a Capital. Cardiff: Cardiff County Council, 2005. .
 Writing the Picture. Bridgend: Seren, 2010. .
 The 1960s Photographed by David Hurn. London: Reel Art Press, 2015. .
 Arizona Trips. London: Reel Art, 2017. Photographs by Hurn. . Edited by Tony Nourmand. Foreword by Christopher Frayling.

Zines by Hurn
California. Southport: Café Royal, 2017. Edition of 200 copies.
Wales 1970s. Southport: Café Royal, 2017. Edition of 200 copies.
Wales 1990s. Southport: Café Royal, 2017. Edition of 200 copies.
Wales 2010s. Southport: Café Royal, 2018. Edition of 200 copies.

Publications with others
 On Being a Photographer: a Practical Guide. Photography & the Creative Process: a Series by LensWork Publishing. Anacortes, WA: Lenswork Publishing, 1997. . With Bill Jay. And subsequent editions.
 On Looking at Photographs: A Practical Guide. Anacortes, WA: Lenswork Publishing, 2000. . With Bill Jay.

Awards
1979/80: UK/USA Bicentennial Fellowship
2016: Honorary Fellowship of the Royal Photographic Society

Exhibitions
2014: Land of My Father, Multimedia Art Museum, Moscow, 2014. Part of the Britain in Focus theme of Photobiennale 2014, the UK-Russia Year of Culture.
2017: 44 Mile Radius, Tilt & Shift Gallery, Llanrwst, Wales, 2017. Photographs made by Hurn within a 44-mile radius of Llanrwst.

TV programs about Hurn
David Hurn: A Life in Pictures. 40 minutes. BBC, 2017.

Collections
British Council, London
Amgueddfa Cymru – National Museum Wales

Notes

References

External links
Magnum Photos biography and portfolio
David Hurn interview by Graham Harrison at Photo Histories
Fonda memories at The Times
Picture this at the Western Mail
2015 2-part audio interview with Ffoton in Wales
Ffoton video with David Hurn telling the story behind his 'Swaps' collection
Ffoton video with David Hurn & Daniel Meadows reviewing the first 'Swaps' exhibition at National Museum Wales, Cardiff

1934 births
People from Redhill, Surrey
Living people
Welsh photographers
Magnum photographers
Documentary photographers
People from Cardiff